The Kinzie Street Bridge is a single-leaf bascule bridge built in 1909 that spans the Chicago River in downtown Chicago, Illinois, United States.

Incidents
In April 1992, rehabilitation work on the pilings for the bridge damaged a freight tunnel located under the Chicago River. The tunnel breach eventually led to the Chicago flood, which flooded the Chicago Loop with an estimated  of water.

In August 2004, a Dave Matthews Band tour bus passing over the bridge intentionally dumped 800 pounds of human waste through the open metal grate bridge deck into the Chicago River. The waste landed on an architecture tour cruise boat and passengers passing under the bridge at that time.

References

External links
 

Bridges in Chicago
Truss bridges in the United States
Road bridges in Illinois
Bascule bridges in the United States